Adriatik Hoxha (born 9 March 1990 in Kolonjë, Fier) is an Albanian athlete who specializes in the shot put. He represented his country at the 2012 Summer Olympics failing to qualify for the final.

Competition record

References

External links
 
 

1990 births
Living people
Albanian shot putters
Male shot putters
Albanian male athletes
Olympic athletes of Albania
Athletes (track and field) at the 2012 Summer Olympics
European Games competitors for Albania
Athletes (track and field) at the 2015 European Games
World Athletics Championships athletes for Albania
People from Kolonjë
Athletes (track and field) at the 2009 Mediterranean Games
Mediterranean Games competitors for Albania